The Prespa spirlin (Alburnoides prespensis) is a fish species of family Cyprinidae. Native to the Balkans: Lake Prespa in Greece, North Macedonia, and Albania. Benthopelagic temperate freshwater fish, up to 9 cm in length.

References 

 

Alburnoides
Fish described in 1924
Freshwater fish of Europe